Allomothering, allomaternal infant care/handling, or non-maternal infant care/handling is performed by any group member other than the mother. Alloparental care is provided by group members other than the genetic father or the mother and thus is distinguished from parental care. Both are widespread phenomena among social insects, birds and mammals.

Allomothering comprises a wide variety of behaviours including: carrying, provisioning, grooming, touching, nursing (allonursing), and protecting infants from predators or conspecifics. Depending on age-sex composition of groups alloparents, helpers or "handlers" can be non-reproductive males in polyandrous systems, reproductive or non-reproductive adult females, young or older juveniles, or older brothers or sisters helping to raise their younger siblings.

Non-human primates

The term allomother first appeared in a sociobiological analysis of reproductive strategies among langur monkeys and referred to group members other than the mother who share care of infants.  Allomothering turns out to be common across the primate order and occurs in Vervets, cebus monkeys, squirrel monkeys, various macaques, New World monkeys and prosimians as female or male group members assist the mother by carrying or guarding infants from predators, and in some New World monkeys such as tamarins and marmosets, helping to provision them.   

Allomaternal care varies greatly across and within different species, families, subfamilies, and groups of primates. Mothers within the same group often vary significantly in the amount of access they allow allomothers. Differing levels of allomaternal care are present in almost 75% of primate species for which there is data and among 100% of callitrichids.  
Allomaternal care by adult males is most often provided in species in which there is a relatively high degree of paternity certainty, such as within pair living species. However, unrelated adult males have been observed to provide allomaternal care as in fat-tailed lemurs and barbary macaques.

The majority of allomaternal care in group living primate species is provided by females and juveniles. Juveniles are often older siblings, but don’t necessarily provide allomaternal care exclusively to their siblings. Allomothering is most common in species with close female relationships and relaxed female dominance hierarchies.

Number of allomothers

The number of allomothers involved in the allomaternal care of a single infant varies by species. In Hanuman langurs, infants receive allomaternal care from most of the females within the group, while in capped langurs, one adult female typically acts as the primary allomother for an infant.

Infant's age

The age at which infants receive care from allomothers also varies greatly by species. Research on wedge-capped capuchins has found that infants receive no allomaternal care during the first three months of their lives, and they receive the greatest amounts of allomaternal care between the ages of four and six months. However, potential allomothers show interest and investigate infants who are under three months old. Alternatively, research on wild capped langurs found that infants spent about ⅓ of their time with a single allomother during their first month of life, and after this point, time engaged in allomaternal care declined. Wild Formosan macaque infants receive the highest rates of allomaternal handling between the ages of four and seven weeks, and allomaternal care rates decrease greatly between 20 and 24 weeks of age.

Infant's sex

There is evidence that some primate species differentially provide allomaternal care based on the infant's sex. This sex-bias in allomaternal care is noted in wild Formosan macaques. In a study of this species, adult females participated in higher rates of allomaternal care with female infants than with male infants, while juvenile females engaged in higher rates of allomaternal care with male infants than with female infants.

Allonursing

Cebus monkey females have been known to regularly nurse (allonurse) infants who are not their own (cf. wet nurse). In these species allonursing is performed by related and unrelated females. Moreover, about 10% of nursing bouts are attributed to allonursing. Allonursing is a widespread, though infrequent, behavior among female wedge-capped capuchins. Allomothering can also be performed by non-reproductive helpers like in the callitrichids (marmosets and tamarins).

Cooperative breeding

In the callitrichids, allomothering care goes beyond many other species and infants are spontaneously provisioned by all group members without a prior begging call on the part of the infants. These species practice facultative cooperative breeding, where a single dominant female reproduces and other group members (fathers, other males and non-reproductive juveniles) provide the majority of care to the infants.

Proposed explanations

Multiple explanations have been proposed for the adaptive value of allomaternal care and who benefits from it: the mother, the infant, or the allomother.

Kin selection hypothesis

Older siblings promoting their own genetic material via helping their younger siblings are explained by the inclusive fitness theory: offspring of the same parents are, on average, genetically equally close to their siblings as they would be to their own progeny. Under kin selection theory, related allomothers may improve their inclusive fitness if the allomothering behaviour contributes to the infant's survival or a faster reproductive rate for the mother since this will increase the related allomother’s genetic success. Fairbanks, 1990 found that in captive Vervet Monkeys, juveniles were most likely to provide allocare to an infant sibling or the infant of a high ranking mother. In Wedge-capped Capuchins, the degree of relatedness best predicts allomaternal interactions, and female siblings are the most likely to act as allomothers to infants. However, kin selection doesn’t account for all allomaternal behavior since non-kin subadults and females often are the ones providing allocare. Young females with siblings may just have more opportunities to care for related infants.

Learning to mother hypothesis

A number of adaptive functions have been proposed to account for the widespread incidents of allomaternal care in mammalian and avian species. Jane Lancaster noted the reproductive benefits for primates as k-strategists in learning to be better mothers, or acquiring mothering skills. Her learning-to-mother hypothesis postulates that primate females with no children of their own participate in allomothering more frequently than expected, and evidence from studies by Sarah Hrdy and Lynn Fairbanks supports this hypothesis. However, experienced and pregnant mothers may also benefit from mothering practice. The hypothesis is supported by evidence of the success of allomothering as a learning technique. First time mothers have high rates of infant mortality, but the rate is reduced for females who engaged in allomaternal behavior as juveniles prior to the birth of their first offspring. So, more alloparenting as a juvenile corresponds with greater reproductive success for the female. Allomothers may face energetic, social, and reproductive costs, but are potentially benefited by learning how to parent and practicing parenting skills which results in higher survival rates for their first born offspring.  This benefit to the allomother may be potentially costly to the infant and its mother. However, this hypothesis is disputed by evidence such as the observation that in wild Formosan Macaques, nulliparous and multiparous adult females engage in similar rates of allomaternal care.

Alliance formation hypothesis

Other hypotheses include "alliance-formation", where subordinate allomothers endeavour to form social alliances with dominant mothers by interacting with their infants. Infants may also gain valuable social skills by interacting with allomothers. Infants may form social-alliances of their own, and improve their chances of having future dispersal partners. This is especially apparent in some species of Colobine old world monkeys where relationships are generally built less around kinship (as compared to Cercopithecine old world monkeys). In Colobines, allomaternal care may allow infants to form social networks and relationships that are separate from their mother's relationships. Allomaternal care may also be a form of reciprocal altruism between females in a group. In some cases, allomothering may also improve the chances for an infant to be adopted by another resident female should the mother die.

By-product hypothesis

Another explanation is that selection for allomaternal behavior may just be a by-product of selection for maternal behavior, and that there is no specific adaptive value to allomaternal care. This theory is supported by observations that females who provide allomaternal care more often also end up being better mothers, so these females may be predisposed to care for infants. However, this hypothesis would not explain the high levels of allocare seen by juvenile, subadult or unrelated adult males in many [primate] species.

Reproductive fitness hypothesis

An infant's birthmother, in a climate of allomothering, may gain time relieved from parental duties which can provide her with energetic advantages by allowing her to reduce levels of maternal care and expend less energy carrying her infant, and by allowing her to forage more efficiently. These energetic benefits may allow the mother to gain direct fitness benefits as she may be able to reproduce more quickly (i.e. reduce her inter-birth interval) due to allomaternal care providing her with the ability to more quickly invest in physical preparation for her next offspring. A reduction in inter-birth interval and a subsequent increase in the mother's reproductive rate may ultimately increase her lifetime reproductive success. Infants may also benefit from their mother's more effective feeding and allomaternal care through a faster maturation and growth rate or earlier weaning time (at a younger age but not at a lower weight).

Malicious behavior
Allomothering care may not always be beneficial. In some cases "aunting-to-death" has been reported, where females withhold an infant from their mother until the infant dies, which can be explained either as incompetence or as competition in favor of the aunts' own offspring. In other cases infants may be kidnapped and receive life-threatening bites or hits from a supposed-alloparent. 

Little allomaternal care has been observed in cercopithecine old world monkeys and great apes. However, some cercopithecine species including vervet monkeys, patats monkeys, and talapoins exhibit high levels of allomaternal care. In some cercopithecine species, allomaternal care is present, but is restricted to older infants. In most cercopithecine species and in great apes, mothers have near constant contact with their young infants. The degree of allowed allomaternal care is proposed to be dependent on the risk this behavior entails for the infant. Notably, at least cercopithecine females are extremely interested in infants, so allomaternal care seems to be limited due to restriction by mothers. Mothers often restrict others' attempts to touch or handle their infants in species where the risk of injury or death is high (e.g. resident-nepotistic Cercopithecine species like Japanese macaques). In some species of cercopithecine monkeys with rigid female dominance hierarchies, a non-lactating female may refuse to return an infant to its lower ranking mother which results in the infant starving to death. Mothers can always get their babies back if there is no strict dominance hierarchy. In some species of cercopithecine monkeys, multiparous females, especially those who have infants or are pregnant, can be aggressive to infants that are not their own. Kidnapping and aggression may be forms of reducing reproductive competition between females. This behavior makes the allowance of allocare by mothers riskier.  

Higher levels of abuse in allomaternal infant handling and a more restrictive mothering style may be seen in cercopithecine species due to high levels of within group contest competition for food and despotic and nepotistic social structures for females. In general, colobine and cercopithecine old world monkeys display distinctive patterns of allomaternal care with colobines allowing extensive allomaternal care of young infants, and cercopithecines, baboons and macaques in particular, allowing little to no allomaternal care of young infants. It is proposed that the general difference in levels of allomaternal care between the two Cercopithecoid subfamilies may be due to their differing diets and subsequently different levels of feeding competition which may have influenced the development of differing social structures. Colobines are folivorous herbivores who exhibit a large degree of dietary flexibility. Their dietary patterns are hypothesized to have contributed to low intra-group scramble competition for food which appears to have influenced the development of social groups with high levels of social interaction and a relaxed female dominance hierarchy. This non-strict female hierarchy appears to have enhanced the benefits and reduced the costs of allomaternal care which allowed for the evolution of allomothering in colobine species. By contrast, cercopithecine species are generally omnivorous and engage in high levels of within group contest competition for food, which is hypothesized to have influenced the formation of strict female dominance hierarchies. This strict female hierarchy appears to have reduced the benefits and increased the costs of allomaternal care, which may explain the low rates of allomothering observed in most cercopithecine species. The differing dietary needs, the feeding patterns they resulted in, and the social systems influenced in part by feeding patterns are potential sources of evolutionary processes that led to distinct differences in allomaternal care between the colobine and cercopithecine subfamilies. Colobines low rates of female-female competition and relaxed female dominance hierarchy allow mothers to retrieve their infants, and make it so that group members don't harm infants. Infant mishandling and infanticide are generally more common in cercopithecines, which may explain why colobines, in general, allow high degrees of allomaternal care while cercopithecines generally allow little or no allomaternal care.

Allomothering in apes

Apes may refuse to share infants because of fears for their safety. Chimpanzee infants are at risk of being killed by infanticidal males, for reproductive access to the mother, and females, for greater access to resources, and young alloparents might not be experienced enough to successfully protect the infant. Females typically leave their natal groups, so available allomothers are usually non kin. However, research by Bădescu, Watts, Katzenberg, & Sellen on wild chimpanzees at Ngogo, Uganda observed allomothering with some individuals. They found large variation on rates of allomothering within the group. Experienced mothers allowed more allomothering, perhaps because siblings often acted as allomothers. Allomaternal care in chimpanzees provides mothers with reproductive benefits. This research found that infants who received more allomaternal handling nursed less frequently and so their mothers lactated less. Longer periods between nursing due to allomaternal care led to reduced lactation and faster infant weaning, but not increased infant mortality, and faster return of ovulation for mothers. The mothers were able to reduce their inter-birth intervals and so increase their reproductive success. However, mothers with previous offspring wean their infants faster, so reduced weaning time may be due to experience or mothers with previous offspring may produce more nutritious milk, and the noted differences in weaning time may not have to do with allomaternal care.

References

 
 
 
 

Babycare
Primate behavior